State Road 243 is a north–south highway located in the west central part of Indiana near Cloverdale.

Route description
The southern terminus of State Road 243 is at State Road 42 in Cunot.  Going north, the highway passes through the Leiber State Recreation Area, which features the man-made Cagles Mill Lake and Cataract Falls, the state's largest waterfalls.  Cagles Mill and Dam are also an attraction.  Just north of the park, State Road 243 has an interchange with Interstate 70.  It then proceeds north to U.S. Route 40 in Putnamville.

Major intersections

References

External links

 Indiana Highway Ends - SR 243

243
Transportation in Owen County, Indiana
Transportation in Putnam County, Indiana